Seri is a Village Development Committee in Mugu District in the Karnali Zone of north-western Nepal. At the time of the 2012 Nepal census it had a population of 2307 people residing in 384 individual households.

References

External links
UN map of the municipalities of Mugu District

Populated places in Mugu District